Pagodula parechinata is a species of sea snail, a marine gastropod mollusk in the family Muricidae, the murex snails or rock snails.

Description

Distribution
This species occurs in the Atlantic Ocean off the Canary Islands.

References

 Houart R. (2001). A review of the Recent Mediterranean and Northeastern Atlantic species of Muricidae. Evolver, Roma 227 p.: page(s): 133–134, 207

Gastropods described in 2001
Pagodula